Renato Berta is a Swiss cinematographer and film director, best known for his collaborations with directors Alain Tanner and Jean-Marie Straub. Trained at the Centro Sperimentale di Cinematografia in Rome, Berta has worked as cinematographer in more than 100 films since 1969. He won a César Award for Best Cinematography for Au revoir les enfants in 1988 and a David di Donatello for Best Cinematography for Noi credevamo in 2011.

In 2013, he was awarded the Chevalier of the Ordre des Arts et des Lettres.

Filmography

References

External links

 Renato Berta on AFC

Living people
Swiss cinematographers
Swiss film directors
1945 births
People from Bellinzona
Chevaliers of the Ordre des Arts et des Lettres